Senator Augustine may refer to:

Kathy Augustine (1956–2006), Nevada State Senate
Malcolm Augustine (born 1969), Maryland State Senate